Samuel John Potter (June 29, 1753October 14, 1804) was a United States senator from Rhode Island and was a prominent Country Party anti-Federalist leader.

Early life
Potter was born in South Kingstown on June 29, 1753. He was one of seven children born to John Potter (1724–1787) and, his second wife, Elizabeth ( Hazard) Potter (1729–1806). Before his parents marriage, his father was married to Mary Hazard, his mother's elder sister.

His paternal grandparents were Ichabod Potter III and Sarah ( Robinson) Gardiner. His maternal grandparents were Mary ( Robinson) Hazard and Stephen Hazard, a Justice of the Inferior Court of Common Pleas.

Career
Potter completed preparatory studies, studied law, and was admitted to the bar and practiced.  He was deputy governor of Rhode Island from 1790 to 1799 (during which time the office was renamed lieutenant Governor) and again from 1800 to 1803. He was also a presidential elector in 1792 and 1796.

Potter was elected as a Democratic-Republican to the U.S. Senate and served from March 4, 1803, until his death in 1804.

Personal life
On September 10, 1788, Potter married Ann Nancy Segar in South Kingstown. Ann was a daughter of Joseph Segar and Mary ( Taylor) Segar. Together, they were the parents of:

 Isaac Fenner Potter (1796–1883), who married Sally Ennis in 1839.

Potter died in Washington, D.C., on October 14, 1804. He was interned in the family burial ground, Kingston (formerly Little Rest), Washington County, Rhode Island.

See also
 List of United States Congress members who died in office (1790–1899)

References

External links

1753 births
1804 deaths
1792 United States presidential electors
1796 United States presidential electors
United States senators from Rhode Island
People from South Kingstown, Rhode Island
Rhode Island Democratic-Republicans
Democratic-Republican Party United States senators
Burials in Rhode Island
18th-century American politicians
19th-century American politicians